This is a list of electoral divisions and wards in the ceremonial county of Berkshire in South East England. All changes since the re-organisation of local government following the passing of the Local Government Act 1972 are shown. The number of councillors elected for each electoral division or ward is shown in brackets.

Unitary authority councils

Bracknell Forest
Wards from 1 April 1974 (first election 7 June 1973) to 3 May 1979:

Wards from 3 May 1979 to 1 May 2003:

Wards from 1 May 2003 to 2023:

Wards from 2023:

Reading
Wards from 1 April 1974 (first election 7 June 1973) to 5 May 1983:

† minor boundary changes in 1977

Wards from 5 May 1983 to 10 June 2004:

Wards from 10 June 2004 to 5 May 2022:

Wards from 5 May 2022:

Slough
Wards from 1 April 1974 (first election 7 June 1973) to 5 May 1983:

Wards from 5 May 1983 to 10 June 2004:

Wards from 10 June 2004 to 22 May 2014:

Wards from 22 May 2014 to present:

West Berkshire
Wards from 1 April 1974 (first election 7 June 1973) to 5 May 1983:

Wards from 5 May 1983 to 1 May 1997:

Wards from 1 May 1997 to 1 May 2003:

Wards from 1 May 2003 to 2 May 2019:

Wards from 2 May 2019 to present:

Windsor and Maidenhead
Wards from 1 April 1974 (first election 7 June 1973) to 5 May 1983:

Wards from 5 May 1983 to 1 May 2003:

Wards from 1 May 2003 to 2 May 2019:

Wards from 2 May 2019 to present:

Wokingham
Wards from 1 April 1974 (first election 7 June 1973) to 3 May 1979:

Wards from 3 May 1979 to 10 June 2004:

Wards from 10 June 2004 to present:

Former county council

Berkshire
Electoral Divisions from 1 April 1974 (first election 12 April 1973) to 2 May 1985:

† minor boundary changes in 1977

Electoral Divisions from 2 May 1985 to 1 April 1998 (county abolished):

Electoral wards by constituency

Bracknell
Bullbrook, Central Sandhurst, College Town, Crown Wood, Crowthorne, Finchampstead North, Finchampstead South, Great Hollands North, Great Hollands South, Hanworth, Harmans Water, Little Sandhurst and Wellington, Old Bracknell, Owlsmoor, Priestwood and Garth, Wildridings and Central, Wokingham Without.

Maidenhead
Belmont, Bisham and Cookham, Boyn Hill, Bray, Charvil, Coronation, Cox Green, Furze Platt, Hurley and Walthams, Hurst, Maidenhead Riverside, Oldfield, Pinkneys Green, Remenham, Sonning, Twyford, Wargrave and Ruscombe.

Newbury
Aldermaston, Basildon, Bucklebury, Chieveley, Clay Hill, Cold Ash, Compton, Downlands, Falkland, Greenham, Hungerford, Kintbury, Lambourn Valley, Northcroft, St Johns, Speen, Thatcham Central, Thatcham North, Thatcham South and Crookham, Thatcham West, Victoria.

Reading East
Abbey, Bulmershe and Whitegates, Caversham, Church, Katesgrove, Loddon, Mapledurham, Park, Peppard, Redlands, South Lake, Thames.

Reading West
Battle, Birch Copse, Calcot, Kentwood, Minster, Norcot, Pangbourne, Purley on Thames, Southcote, Theale, Tilehurst, Westwood, Whitley.

Slough
Baylis and Stoke, Britwell, Central, Chalvey, Cippenham Green, Cippenham Meadows, Farnham, Foxborough, Haymill, Kedermister, Langley St Mary's, Upton, Wexham Lea.

Windsor
Ascot, Ascot and Cheapside, Binfield with Warfield, Castle Without, Clewer East, Clewer North, Clewer South, Colnbrook with Poyle, Datchet, Eton and Castle, Eton Wick, Horton and Wraysbury, Old Windsor, Park, Sunningdale, Sunninghill and South Ascot, Warfield Harvest Ride.

See also
List of parliamentary constituencies in Berkshire

References

 
Berkshire
Wards